The Huawei MateBook series is a range of laptops produced by Huawei. They were originally released on the eve of the opening of the Mobile World Congress on February 21, 2016. Further models have been released in subsequent years such as in September 2019, when Huawei began offering Deepin as a pre-loaded operating system on selected Matebook models in China.

The Huawei MateBook X Pro is the top of their range model.

Products

References

Huawei laptops